Reed Charles O'Connor (born June 1, 1965) is a United States district judge of the United States District Court for the Northern District of Texas. He was nominated by President George W. Bush in 2007.

Early life and career
Born in Houston, Texas to George John O'Connor and Eileen Star Boyle, O'Connor received a Bachelor of Science degree from the University of Houston in 1986 and a Juris Doctor from South Texas College of Law in 1989. He was in private practice in Texas from 1989 to 1994 and an assistant district attorney with the Tarrant County District Attorney's Office in Fort Worth, Texas from 1994 to 1998. O'Connor then served as Assistant United States Attorney of the Northern District of Texas from 1998 to 2007. From 2003 to 2007, he worked on the staff of the United States Senate Committee on the Judiciary.

Federal judicial career
On June 27, 2007, O'Connor was nominated by President George W. Bush to a seat on the United States District Court for the Northern District of Texas vacated by A. Joe Fish. The United States Senate confirmed O'Connor's appointment on November 16, 2007, and he received his commission on November 21, 2007.

Significant cases
O'Connor has widely been described as conservative. O'Connor has become a "go-to" favorite for conservative lawyers, as he tends to reliably rule against Democratic policies. Attorneys General in Texas appear to strategically file cases in O'Connor's jurisdiction so that he will hear them.

On February 11, 2015, O'Connor held that a portion of the federal Gun Control Act of 1968 was unconstitutional. This ruling was reversed on appeal.

On March 26, 2015, O'Connor enjoined the federal government's definition of marriage as it relates to the Family and Medical Leave Act of 1993. He dissolved the injunction following the Supreme Court's decision in Obergefell v. Hodges.

On August 21, 2016, O'Connor issued a ruling against the Obama administration dealing with the government's interpretation of Title IX rules.  The guidance from the White House was issued in May 2016, and addresses the Title IX requirement that schools receiving federal funding not discriminate against students on the basis of sex. The ruling required that transgender students be allowed to use the bathroom that corresponds to their gender identity. O'Connor ruled that the new guidelines did not receive proper notice and comment prior to publication, and that Title IX and its implementing regulation are "not ambiguous" as to the "plain meaning of the term sex as used". He then issued a nationwide injunction preventing them from being enforced with respect to students' access to "intimate facilities." The Obama administration appealed the decision, but the Trump administration rescinded the guidance and moved to dismiss the appeal.

On December 31, 2016, in a separate case, O'Connor issued a preliminary injunction against enforcement of the Obama administration's regulations implementing Section 1557 of the Affordable Care Act (prohibiting sex discrimination in federally funded health programs) as a likely violation of the Religious Freedom Restoration Act and what he said was an improper inclusion of gender identity discrimination.

In early 2018, O'Connor held the Certification Rule of the Affordable Care Act unconstitutional in Texas v. Commissioner of Internal Revenue, finding it violated the nondelegation doctrine.  This ruling was reversed on appeal.

On October 5, 2018, O'Connor ruled that the Indian Child Welfare Act was unconstitutional.

On October 31, 2021, O'Connor ruled that the First Amendment and the Religious Freedom Restoration Act provide religious employers an exemption from Title VII of the Civil Rights Act's ban on discrimination "on the basis of...sex".

In 2022, O'Connor issued a preliminary injunction blocking the Pentagon from enforcing a COVID-19 vaccine requirement for its Navy Seals. O'Connor said the U.S. government had "no license" to abrogate the freedoms of the Navy SEALs. The preliminary injunction was partially stayed by the Supreme Court on March 25, 2022.

In October of 2022, O'Connor ruled that the Boeing Company committed criminal acts when not disclosing the MCAS system of the FAA. This contradicted the previous settlement the federal government made with Boeing, and opened the door for new legal action by victims families.

Affordable Care Act 

On December 14, 2018, O'Connor ruled that the Affordable Care Act was unconstitutional. O'Connor ruled that the individual mandate was unconstitutional by saying "[the] Individual Mandate can no longer be fairly read as an exercise of Congress's Tax Power and is still impermissible under the Interstate Commerce Clause—meaning the Individual Mandate is unconstitutional." This is in reference to National Federation of Independent Business v. Sebelius (2012) which ruled that the individual mandate was constitutional because of the tax penalty.  The penalty was reduced to $0 by the 2017 tax bill starting in 2019. The ruling was deemed likely to be appealed, with both Republican and Democratic legal experts saying that the legal challenge to the Affordable Care Act was unlikely to succeed. The Affordable Care Act would remain in effect throughout the appeals process. President Donald Trump commended the ruling on Twitter.

Legal experts who both support and oppose the Affordable Care Act harshly criticized O'Connor's ruling, with The Washington Post noting that legal scholars considered O'Connor's ruling "as a tortured effort to rewrite not just the law but congressional history." Ted Frank, director of litigation at the conservative Competitive Enterprise Institute said the ruling was "embarrassingly bad." Nicholas Bagley said O'Connor's ruling was "about as naked a piece of judicial activism as I have ever seen; I don't even think it's close." Jonathan H. Adler and Abbe R. Gluck, who were on opposing sides of the 2012 and 2015 Supreme Court challenges to the Affordable Care Act, wrote a joint opinion editorial in The New York Times where they described the ruling as "lawless", "a mockery of the rule of law and basic principles of democracy" and "an exercise of raw judicial power."

While O'Connor's ruling was upheld on appeal to the United States Court of Appeals for the Fifth Circuit, O'Connor and the Fifth Circuit were reversed by the Supreme Court of the United States in a 7-2 ruling issued on June 17, 2021, which stated that the parties involved in the lawsuit did not have standing to bring the suit. Associate Justice Stephen Breyer was joined in the majority by Chief Justice John Roberts and Associate Justices Clarence Thomas, Sonia Sotomayor, Elena Kagan, Brett Kavanaugh, and Amy Coney Barrett.  Thomas wrote a concurring opinion while Associate Justice Samuel Alito wrote a dissenting opinion and was joined by Associate Justice Neil Gorsuch.

References

External links

1965 births
Living people
Assistant United States Attorneys
Judges of the United States District Court for the Northern District of Texas
Lawyers from Houston
South Texas College of Law alumni
United States district court judges appointed by George W. Bush
21st-century American judges
University of Houston alumni